The Legend of Kyrandia: Book One is a 2D point-and-click adventure game, and the first game in the Fables & Fiends series. It was developed by Westwood Studios and published by Virgin Games in August 1992. Players take on the role of a young prince who must end the tyrannical chaos of an evil court jester in his kingdom. The game makes use of a simple interface system that allows the player to interact with objects and people, while solving various puzzles using a variety of items and special abilities.

The game proved a commercial success and was praised for many of its elements. Its success spawned two sequels: The Legend of Kyrandia: Hand of Fate in 1993; and The Legend of Kyrandia: Malcolm's Revenge in 1994. GOG.com released an emulated version for Microsoft Windows and Mac OS X in 2013.

Gameplay
The Legend of Kyrandia utilizes a point-and-click interface which is more simple than similar games of its era, which instead relied on more complex multi-action interfaces. In the game, players can click on anything to examine and interact with objects, items in a scene and people. Any objects that can be taken can be stored in a simple inventory, with the player able to carry a set amount on their character, but able to drop objects within a scene for later collection or removal. The game features a variety of puzzles and scenes to explore, though also features hazardous obstacles, traps, and moments that can incur death; being killed automatically ends the game, and forces players to start a new game or reload from the last save they made. One of the more unique elements in the game is a special amulet with colored gems, each of which can be used to solve a puzzle with a special magic.

Plot
In the fantasy kingdom of Kyrandia, King William and Queen Katherine are murdered by court jester Malcolm. The kingdom's powerful magic users, known as the Mystics, imprison Malcolm in the royal castle, while their chief Kallak goes into hiding in order to raise their son Brandon, his grandson, in secret. Eighteen years later, Malcolm's prison breaks, allowing him to escape and make use of the castle's most valuable treasure called the Kyragem - a mystic stone containing the kingdom's vast magical power, in order to seek revenge. Kallak, sensing Malcolm's escape, leaves a message for Brandon, before he is turned to stone by the jester. Finding him petrified, Brandon is contacted by the trees and informed that he is the only one left to defeat Malcolm.

Seeking help, Brandon meets with three of the Mystics, who each help him on his quest, including supplying him with an amulet that has gems he must restore to aid his task. In the process, he quickly learns of his identity, due to Kallak keeping the knowledge from him while he was growing up, and that the Kyragem cannot be accessed without the royal treasures. After restoring the amulet and locating one of the treasures, Brandon heads to the castle, now occupied by Malcolm, finding that his former friends and allies have been turned to stone for aiding him. Upon locating the other treasures, Brandon proceeds to the Kyragem, and defeats Malcolm by making him inadvertently reflect a spell back onto himself, turning the jester to stone.

With the land free, Brandon assumes his rightful role as Kyrandia's new king, reuniting with Kallak to celebrate the restoration of the land and the freeing of the Kyragem.

Reception
According to designer Rick Gush, The Legend of Kyrandia was commercially successful. He noted that it was "a solid A-minus or B-plus" title that helped to secure Westwood's "new relationship with Virgin". Its later bundle with its sequels, Hand of Fate and Malcolm's Revenge, continued this success with "tens of thousands of copies [added] to the sales totals in the first few months". The Legend of Kyrandia series as a whole, totaled above 250,000 units in sales by August 1996.

In 1992, Computer Gaming Worlds Robin Matthews described The Legend of Kyrandia "as a cross between Loom, King's Quest V and Secret of Monkey Island 2", praising the "beautifully drawn" VGA graphics and humor. The magazine concluded that the "storyline is hardly original ... but the presentation of the game, the general quality and the feel, make this a promising debut and a welcome addition to the world of graphic adventures". In April 1994 the magazine said that the CD version "is a quality product throughout" that added digitized voices to the "excellent, if somewhat short" game's "Stunning graphics and sound", and advised Westwood to "just release the CD version of their titles first". The first installment in the series received 5/5 in Dragon magazine.

References

External links

Fables & Fiends: Book One - The Legend Of Kyrandia at Hall of Light
Review in Compute!

1992 video games
Adventure games
Amiga games
DOS games
FM Towns games
NEC PC-9801 games
Point-and-click adventure games
ScummVM-supported games
Single-player video games
Video game franchises
Video games developed in the United States
Video games scored by Frank Klepacki
Video games set in castles
Virgin Interactive games
Westwood Studios games